A news director is an individual at a broadcast station or network or a newspaper who is in charge of the news department.  In local news, the news director is typically in charge of the entire news staff, including journalists, news presenters, photographers, copy writers, television producers, and other technical staff.  The director also keeps track of how the show is going on, as well as talking to the producer to get things going.

Typically, the only individual at a station/network or publication who wields more power than the news director is a general manager or company president.

See also 
 Director of network programming

Notes

Broadcasting occupations
Management occupations
Journalism occupations